Elections to Tynedale District Council were held on 6 May 1999. The whole council was up for election, with boundary changes increasing the number of councillors by five, since the last election in 1995. The council stayed under no overall control.

Election Result

|}

References

1999 English local elections
1999
20th century in Northumberland